Tosenini is a tribe of cicadas in the family Cicadidae. There are at least 10 described species in Tosenini, found in the Palearctic and Indomalaya.

Genera
These genera belong to the tribe Tosenini:
 Ayuthia Distant, 1919
 Distantalna Boulard, 2009
 Tosena Amyot & Audinet-Serville, 1843
 Trengganua Moulton, 1923 (monotypic)

References

Further reading

External links

 

 
Tibiceninae
Hemiptera tribes
Hemiptera of Asia